Canglang Subdistrict is a subdistrict of Hanshou County in Hunan, China. Dividing a part of the former Zhumushan Township, the subdistrict was established in December 2015. The subdistrict has 4 communities and 11 villages under its jurisdiction.

External links
 Official Website (Chinese / 中文)

References

Hanshou
Subdistricts of Hunan